Princeton Terrace Club is one of eleven current eating clubs at Princeton University in Princeton, New Jersey, United States. Terrace Club was founded in 1904 and is located at 62 Washington Road. It is the sole Princeton eating club located off Prospect Avenue.

Membership and culture
In 1967, Terrace became the first eating club to switch to a nonselective lottery "sign-in" system for membership, as opposed to the selective bicker system. Terrace was soon followed by Campus, Colonial, and Cloister. Today five of the 11 remaining operating clubs do not use the bicker system. Terrace was one of the earliest clubs to accept Jewish, African-American, and female members, and today is considered on campus to be the most "alternative," politically liberal eating club. Since 2000, Terrace has been a popular choice for sophomores, filling all of its membership slots either during first round sign-in or by the end of the second round.

Terrace's motto has been "Food=Love" since the mid-eighties. The food is served cafeteria-style and is famous for being more vegetarian-friendly than other clubs. Members of Terrace often refer to the club as "Terrace F. Club" or "TFC". Other nicknames include "the mother," "mother Terrace," or "the womb," and members often refer to themselves as "Terrans".

Weekend events at Terrace often include concerts of indie-scene bands from a variety of genres, including rock, hip-hop, salsa, jazz, and electronica. Many notable artists and groups, including former club member Stanley Jordan, Flipper, Phil Lesh, Yo La Tengo, GWAR, Blues Traveler (Summer '87), ESG, Bim Skala Bim, Elliott Smith, Run DMC, Modest Mouse, The Flaming Lips, Vampire Weekend, Frightened Rabbit, Girl Talk, GZA, Immortal Technique, Stereolab, Snarky Puppy, Action Bronson and Tortoise have played at Terrace, some before they were nationally known. Terrace also hosts the Queer Radicals' Annual Drag Ball in October or November.

History

As was then common practice for newly founded eating clubs, when Terrace Club began in 1904, the members dined in a building on Olden Street known as "The Incubator." This small structure had previously been the original home of Cap & Gown, and had been relocated to Olden Street from Cap and Gown's current location. It served as a temporary home for many eating clubs while their own buildings were under construction or being renovated.

In 1906, the club relocated to the current Washington Road location, which was occupied by a house in the Colonial Revival style which had formerly belonged to faculty member John Grier Hibben. This building was remodeled by architect Frederick Stone in the 1920s to the current configuration with its Tudor-style exterior.

A tea party at Terrace in 1936 is credited as the birthplace of the idea for the short-lived Veterans of Future Wars, an organization that satirized the acceleration of bonus payments to World War I veterans by demanding that its young members be similarly paid for the services they would render their country in conflicts to come.

In 1967, Terrace became the first club to abandon the bicker process. Terrace Club and Colonial Club were the first clubs to accept women following the University's decision to admit women in 1969. In 2011, Terrace became the first club to offer membership to graduate students.

From 1977 until 1984, many of the sign-in clubs faltered due to declining membership numbers, and the Graduate Board seriously considered closing Terrace in 1983. As an attempt to attract new members, chef Larry Frazer began cooking vegetarian meals, a new concept on campus at the time. Frazer was married in Terrace Club in 1982 with the officers acting as attendants and guitarist Stanley Jordan as the musical performer. Frazer later moved on to become chef at Campus Club at the short-lived DEC, and served as the Executive Catering Chef for the University itself.

Much of the reputation Terrace enjoys today grew with the leadership and love of the late Barton R. Rouse, the creative force behind Terrace's parties and excellent food.  Frazer had hired Rouse originally to serve as sous chef in 1984 and Rouse later succeeded Frazer as head chef for the club.  Rouse was the originator of the club's "Food=Love" motto  and brought an imaginative flair to his job, including the creation of themed meals and parties, which soon became a hallmark of the club. Rouse served in this role until his death in 1994.

Notable alumni
Harold Medina '09 - Lawyer and judge notable for hearing landmark cases of conspiracy and treason 
William H. Scheide '36 - Musician, philanthropist, and humanitarian.  Relocated the Scheide Library, "probably the finest private library in existence in the world," to Princeton's Firestone Library. A primary funder of Brown vs. Board of Education.
Mel Ferrer '39 - Actor, film director and producer
Russell E. Train '41 - President of World Wildlife Fund, 1978-1985 
Warren Eginton '45 - Senior U.S. District judge for District of Connecticut
Galway Kinnell '48 - Poet, translator, and author
Jacques-André Istel '49 - Parachutist and "father of modern skydiving"
Richard Riordan '52 - Former mayor of Los Angeles
Alan Blinder '67 - Former Vice Chairman of the U.S. Federal Reserve and professor of economics and public affairs at Princeton University
Madison Smartt Bell '79 - Novelist
Stanley Jordan '81 - Jazz guitarist
Dana L. Harrison '81 - Finance then core organizer of Burning Man festival. Worked with numerous spiritual and creative organizations around the Bay Area. ( Terrace President )
Douglas Rushkoff '83 - Author and media theorist
Walter Kirn '83 - Novelist and Literary Critic
Howard Gordon '84 - TV writer, producer, and showrunner
David Laur '84 - Winner of Sci-Tech Academy Award (Oscar) for work done at Pixar
Jonathan Ames '86/'87 - Writer, raconteur and performance artist, creator of HBO's Bored to Death
Kate Betts '86 - American fashion journalist - senior editor at American Vogue, editor of Harper's Bazaar
Albert Kim '86 - writer and producer, known for Avatar: The Last Airbender, Sleepy Hollow (2013), Nikita (2010), and Leverage (2008). Prior to his TV writing career, Kim was an award-winning journalist who worked as a writer and editor for Sports Illustrated, Entertainment Weekly, Details, and People.
Nils Muižnieks '86 - Human rights activist and political scientist, Council of Europe Commissioner for Human Rights since 2012
Todd Wider '86 - Plastic surgeon and Emmy Award-winning film producer 
Jack Weiss '86 - Former Los Angeles City Council member
Jonathan Weiss '86 - Filmmaker & Founder of Oswalds Mill Audio (OMA) high end audio equipment design & manufacturing company
Sina Najafi '86/'87 - founder and editor-in-chief of New York-based Cabinet Magazine
Jennifer S. Hirsch '88 - Researcher, professor at Columbia University, social justice advocate, and author
Ron Norsworthy '88 - Visual artist, product and production designer (TV Shows, Specials & Music Videos)
Sophia Rosenfeld '88 - Historian, professor, and author
E. Randol Schoenberg '88 - U.S. attorney, based in Los Angeles, California. Successful case in Supreme Court of the United States Republic of Austria v. Altmann in 2004. President of the Los Angeles Museum of the Holocaust.
Theodore Zoli '88 - American structural engineer, and a leading designer of cable-stayed bridges. 2009 MacArthur Fellows Program
Vanessa Friedman '89 - Fashion director and chief fashion critic at The New York Times.
Clifford J. Levy '89 - Two-time winner of the Pulitzer Prize, in 2003 and 2011, for the New York Times,
Josh Marshall '91 - American Polk Award-winning journalist and blogger who founded Talking Points Memo
Mark Feuerstein '93 - Actor
Mohsin Hamid '93 - Author
Peter Moskos '94 - Author
Jordan Roth '97 - President and majority owner of Jujamcyn Theaters
Tim Ferriss '00 - Entrepreneur, investor, and author
Jonathan Safran Foer '00 - Author
Julia Ioffe '05 - Journalist who covers national security and foreign policy topics
Branden Jacobs-Jenkins '06 - Playwright

References

External links
Official Terrace Club Website
List of shows at Terrace
History and culture of the clubs, at Princeton's official site.

Eating clubs at Princeton University
Historic district contributing properties in Mercer County, New Jersey